"Girls" is a song by American rap rock group the Beastie Boys, released in 1987 as well as the music video as the seventh and final single from their debut album Licensed to Ill. This song was never performed live and it is one of the few songs on the album that are not in the vein of their standard rap songs.

Song structure and lyrics
The song is the shortest on the album, lasting just over two minutes long.

Lyrically, the song talks about the narrator (Ad-Rock)'s desire for women. He recalls an experience from two years before with a woman who had an interest in the narrator's bandmate MCA. MCA did not share her feelings and permitted the narrator to pursue her romantically. Ad-Rock takes the woman for a walk near a bay and asks her out but rejects his proposal. She moves to a far away location but in the present day the narrator sees her back in town showing interest in his other bandmate, Mike D.

The arrangement is supplied by a drum machine beat and a simple melody on an electronic keyboard. Mike D and MCA provide wordless backing vocals reminiscent of doo wop that occasionally break into giggles at the song's humorous lyrics and Ad-Rock's exaggerated delivery.

GoldieBlox cover
In 2013 the toy company GoldieBlox used the song with alternative lyrics in a video of a Rube Goldberg machine made primarily out of traditional girls' toys. The group accused the company of copyright infringement, and stated that Adam Yauch's last will prevented the use of their music in advertising. In November 2013, GoldieBlox countersued the Beastie Boys and producer Rick Rubin, saying the use of the song was a parody. In March 2014, the Beastie Boys settled out of court, with GoldieBlox issuing a public apology and making a donation to a charity of the band's choice.

Charts

References

External links
 

1986 songs
1987 singles
Beastie Boys songs
Song recordings produced by Rick Rubin
Songs written by Rick Rubin